Nagmamahal, Manay Gina is a 2003 Philippine television drama anthology broadcast by GMA Network and Super Radyo DZBB. Hosted by Gina de Venecia, it premiered on February 24, 2003 replacing Pira-pirasong Pangarap. The show concluded on August 29, 2003 with a total of 138 episodes.

Overview

The TV broadcast featured a weekly story which began on Monday, and concluded on Friday. While the radio broadcast followed the same format, it featured a different true-to-life story, and was an interactive show: listeners participated in formulating the right conclusion for each episode, every Sunday.

The radio version lasted until 2009 when de Venecia ran for candidacy in the 2010 National Election. She won the position of Congresswoman of the Fourth District of Pangasinan, and got re-elected in 2013. Now, seven years later, her term has ended, and the program was re-launched as Nagmamahal, Manay Gina in the tri-media: DZBB, Tempo & Balita and GMA 7 on June 30.

Production
Upon reformatting, Marichu Maceda, the creative head, and the rest of production team decided that the show should focus more on showcasing true-to-life success stories. They also agreed to present a more intimate portrait of its host, Manay Gina de Venecia. Instead of mere narration, Manay Gina will read the letters of her viewers, often interjecting with her personal sentiments about the subject. Sampaguita TV commissioned the award-winning production designer Tatus Aldana to style a set.

Accolades

 Winner - Best Radio Drama (2003 Catholic Mass Media Award)
 Winner - Best Radio Drama (2004 Catholic Mass Media Award)
 Winner - Best Radio Drama (2008 Catholic Mass Media Award)
 Winner - Best Radio Drama (2009 Catholic Mass Media Award)

References

2003 Philippine television series debuts
2003 Philippine television series endings
Filipino-language television shows
GMA Network original programming
Philippine anthology television series